John Harrington or John Harington may refer to:

Politicians 
 John Harington, 1st Baron Harington (1281–1347)
 John Harington, 2nd Baron Harington (1328–1363)
 John Harington, 4th Baron Harington (1384–1418)
 John Harington (died 1553), MP for Rutland
 John Harington (died 1582), MP for Pembroke Boroughs, Old Sarum and Caernarvon Boroughs
 John Harrington (died 1654) (1589–1654), English politician 
 John Harington (treasurer) (c. 1517–1582), official of Henry VIII of England
 John Harington, 1st Baron Harington of Exton (1539–1613), English politician
 John Harington, 2nd Baron Harington of Exton (1592–1614), English courtier
 John Harrington (Parliamentarian) (1627–1700), English politician
 John Harrington (American politician) (born 1956), American politician and member of the Minnesota State Senate

Others
 Sir John Harrington of Hornby (died 1359), English knight
 John Harrington (knight) (died 1460), Yorkist knight during the Wars of the Roses
 John Harington (writer) (1560–1612), English writer, of Kelston, inventor of the flushing toilet
 John Harrington (Medal of Honor) (1848–1905), Medal of Honor recipient for the Indian Wars
 John L. Harrington (1868–1942), American bridge engineer
 John Peabody Harrington (1884–1961), American ethnologist
 John Harrington (American football) (1921–1992), American football player
 John Harrington (baseball) (born c. 1937), American business manager and baseball executive
 John Harrington (ice hockey) (born 1957), American ice hockey player
 John Herbert Harington (died 1828), British orientalist, colonial administrator and judge

See also 
 John Herrington (disambiguation)
 Harrington (surname)